Mojiganga is a Colombian ska punk and Ska-core band from Medellín formed in 1995.

Founded by Miguel Cardona (Drums), Mauricio Agudelo (Keyboard/Saxophone), Guillermo Garcia (Guitar/Voice) and Juan Zuluaga (Bass) while attending high-school at the Fray Rafael De La Serna School.

Mojiganga is often credited as being among the most representative bands of the Colombia's underground scene during the 90's and 2000's. They had remained independent and had put out six studio records, one live record and several singles for international compilations.

 De Las No Alpacas (1996-Never released)
 Estupidas Guerras (1997)
 Señalados (1999)
 No Estamos Solos (2001)
 Todo Tiempo Pasado Fue Peor (2004)
 Mojiganga (2007)
 Ardiendo Otra Vez (2010)
 Atomico (2013)
 En Vivo 2017 (2017)

The band has gone through several line-ups during its career but still preserve five of its founder members, they are actively playing (as of 2019) and still recording and producing videos.

Band members
Miguel Cardona: Drums (Founder, 1995–Present)
Mauricio Agudelo (Mauro): Tenor Saxophone and vocals (Founder, 1995–Present)
Daniel Puerta: Trumpet and vocals (Founder, 1995–Present)
Natalia Villa: Alto Saxophone (Founder, 1995–Present)
Guillermo Garcia (Guillo): Guitar and Vocals (Founder, 1995-2001/ 2017–present)
Jorge Conde: Bass (2011–Present)
Alejandro Jaramillo: Guitar and Vocals (2013–Present)

Former:

 Federico Lozano: Guitar and vocals (1997-1999)
 Juan Zuluaga: Bass (Founder, 1995-2011)
 Rogelio Acosta: Guitar and vocals (2002-2013)
 Anibal Zapata: Guitar (2002-2013)

History
Miguel, Guillo and Mauro were part of the Fray Rafael's high-school band that at the time played religious ceremonies and events organized by the school. The band, called Ensamble Cofrades did not have any original songs but its repertory consisted of rock en español covers, religious songs, and ye-ye music.

Discontented with the style and antics of the Franciscan order, Miguel (drums) and his cousin Guillo (guitar) began looking for members to start a ska-punk band, they first recruited  Mauricio (keyboard) and Juan, that at the time was learning to play the bass.

The band composed several songs with this line-up before bringing in Natalia (alto saxophone) and Daniel (trumpet) and their name Mojiganga was officially adopted in 1995.

That same year they recorded their first album, De Las No Alpacas (1996). The album was recorded in a four track at Guillo's house. The production and composition value of the album was so poor that the band decided to never release it and instead focus on a more professional production the next year.

At the end of 1997 they contacted Jorge Ceballos, owner of Estudios El Pez in Medellin and recorded Estupidas Guerras (1997). The album consisted of twelve songs and was released in cassette format under their label PUKA! Records.

The album's songs contained a very distinctive style of what Medellin' punk music was at the time plus the addition of a fast horn section, and gritty vocals.

The album was well received by the public and critics and positioned the band as one of the most important acts of the punk scene at the time.

The lyrics touched social issues, break-ups, anti-racism, inequality, friendship and fun times.

About 1000 official copies of the cassette were sold before it was later published with their next album Señalados (1999) in a CD format under the name Todo Tiempo Pasado Fue Peor (2004)

Señalados (1999) was their third album and first one released in CD format, it had great acceptance among the public, selling more than five thousand copies and finding distribution in other countries like Argentina and Mexico. The album was also nominated for the Shock Awards (magazine) under the category "Best Album Cover".

The album had two hits: A Mis Amigos and Relajación, The two songs ranked on the top 10s lists at local radio stations for several weeks. Señalados also won in the Hard Rock Awards under the category "best punk/ska/hardcore band".

Their 4th album No Estamos Solos (2002) was recorded by Ryan Greene, at Motor Studios in San Francisco, California.

The production of this album, along with their first international tour marked the departure of Guillo who went to reside in the United States for several years before returning to play with the band in 2013.

Rogelio Acosta took the role of Guillo on guitar and vocals and Anibal Zapata was also added to the band as a second guitarist. With this line-up the band performed in the most important cities of Colombia and also in other countries like Ecuador, Peru and Panama. They took part at several important music festivals like "Rock al Parque 2003 and 2010" in Bogotá and "Festival Ímpetu 2004" in Ecuador.

In 2004 they were nominated once more to the Shock awards, this time under the category "best Ska band".

Todo tiempo pasado fue peor (2004) was released in 2004 and consisted of a CD split of their first two newly mastered albums; Estupidas Guerras (1997) and Señalados (1999).

Mojiganga (2007) Was released in 2007 as a double album with one CD containing elements of mostly of ska-punk-reggae while the other hardcore-metal touches. This album put out 18 new songs and contained several hits as La Paloma, Otra Noche Mas, Bravucon del Norte and Sangre.

In 2010 with the oversight of Fermin Muguruza, they produced Ardiendo Otra Vez (2010).

The album consist of 7 cover's songs of the band Kortatu and was made as a tribute to the influential Vasque band from the 80's

Juan Zuluaga, one of the founder members left the band in 2011 for academic reasons and Jorge Conde took the role as a bassist. Around that time Anibal Zapata also left and Alejandro Jaramillo joint in 2013 to play guitar and do vocals.

Atomico (2013) was released in digital format in 2013. It was recorded in El Alto Studios in Medellin. The album consisted of 11 songs with a raw sound, focused on a style of mostly punk and hardcore with horns. Mauro and Daniel are in charge of the voices throughout the album.

The release of this album marked two important milestones in the band, Rogelio's departure from the band and the announcement that the band was not longer going to be active.

Rogelio, the front man at the time went to reside permanently in the United States, Mauro moved to Bogotá, and Daniel moved to Lyon, this, along with Natalia's plan to move to Europe and Miguel busy calendar as a commercial pilot forced the band to make a retirement announcement in 2014.

The band went into a 3 years hiatus and in 2016 they announced they would re-assemble bringing in their original guitarist/vocal Guillo. Several shows were announced for Colombia in 2017 and a live album was released at the end of that year. En Vivo 2017 (2017) was recorded live during their performance at the Arena Rock Fest 2017 in Medellin, Colombia.

The band has performed in Colombia several times after that and has put out some video clips in their youtube channel. The band is currently active (as of 2019) and has announced to release a new full album by 2020

Mojiganga had shared stage with international bands as The Offspring, NOFX, Less Than Jake, Los Fabulosos Cadillacs, Molotov, A.N.I.M.A.L., 2 Minutos, La Mosca and Café Tacuba, Attaque 77 among others.

They have also been included on several international compilations, the most important being: Puro skañol ("Pure Skanish"), 1998 by Aztlán Record and Mutante Vol. 1 ("Mutant Vol. 1"), 2004 by Mutante Records.

Discography

Albums

 De Las No Alpacas (1996-Never released)
 Estupidas Guerras (1997)
 Asamblea general de los estudiantes
 Desplazado
 Juan
 Pancracio (cover de Skarabajos)
 Comun sinverguenza
 Skal de cerveza
 Ser-vicio militar
 Todos los fanáticos
 Mi negrita
 Estupidas guerras
 Viejo bar
 Negros (Raza unida)
 Señalados (1999)
 Que nadie te Pise
Mi nación / Como sea
 Contra la pared
 Los radicales
 A mis amigos
 Interes cuanto vales
 No se metan mas
 Relajacion
 Me da igual
 Señorita ardiente
 Del sagrado corazon
 Sin razon no hay vida
 No Estamos Solos (2001)
 De Corazón
Tu vanidad
 Vos sos todo lo que quiero
 El canal de la mentira
 Interes cuanto vales
 Abuso de autoridad
 Uno mas
 Miro hacia atras
 Hasta que muera
 Contra la pared
 Mi propia fe
 Autogestion
 Todo Tiempo Pasado Fue Peor (2004)
 Mojiganga (2007)
 Nada es igual
 La paloma
 Frio
 Otra noche mas
 Rutinas aburridas
 He pasado demasiado tiempo en babilonia
 Radicales II
 Best friends
 Iluso soñador
 El pasado feliz
 No aguanto mas
 Mojiganga
 Vuelve el miedo
 Bravucon del norte
 Sangre
 Seiscientossesentayseis
 Fieles adictos
 Secuestrados
 Ardiendo Otra Vez (2010)
 La Cultura
 La familia Iskariote
 Mierda de ciudad
 La linea del frente
 El último ska de Manolo rastaman
 A la calle
 Zu Atrapatu Arte
 Atomico (2013)
 Afan de fama
 Atrapado
 La vida es corta
 Sin garantias
 La buena educación
 1000 cervezas
 dias perfectos
 Maldito pais
 Soñando con volver
 Libertad
 La +
 En Vivo 2017 (2017)
 Tu vanidad
La familia Izkariote
 Asamblea general de los estudiantes
 Autogestion
 Abuso de autoridad / Negros
 Pancracio
 Libertad
 De corazon
 Sangre
 A mis amigos
 relajacion

Compilations
 Puro Skañol Vol. 3 ("Pure Skañol Vol. 3"), 1998
 Truchorama, 2003
Mutante Vol. 1, 2004
 La música es Una ("The Music is One"), 2004

References

External links
Official band web site - Source for this article.
Youtube Channel

Rock en Español music groups
Third-wave ska groups
Colombian punk rock groups
Musical groups from Medellín
1995 establishments in Colombia